Robert Dick Douglas (1875–1960) was a North Carolina attorney who served as North Carolina Attorney General briefly in 1900-1901.  He was believed to be the youngest attorney general in the state's history.

Early life and education
Robert was the first son and second child of Robert M. Douglas and Jessie Madeline Dick. He was a grandson of Sen. Stephen A. Douglas of Illinois and of Robert P. Dick, a North Carolina state Supreme Court justice. Douglas graduated from Georgetown University and "read the law" under his grandfather Dick.

Career
At the age of 25, Douglas was appointed by Gov. Daniel L. Russell to serve out the remainder of Attorney General Zeb V. Walser's term. At the time of his appointment, he was the youngest person to ever serve as North Carolina Attorney General and the youngest person serving as a state attorney general in the country. After that he built a practice of law in Greensboro, North Carolina, where he also served as postmaster.

In 1932, Douglas gave or sold his grandfather Stephen A. Douglas's papers to the University of Chicago.

References

New York Times, December 24, 1900
Stephen Douglas Genealogy
Robert Dick Douglas, Jr., The Best 90 Years of My Life, 2007

1875 births
1960 deaths
North Carolina lawyers
North Carolina Attorneys General